"Bootzilla" is a song recorded by Bootsy's Rubber Band, released on January 13, 1978. As the lead single from the album Bootsy? Player of the Year, it held the #1 spot on the R&B chart for one week in 1978 (directly following fellow P-Funk outfit Parliament's #1 hit "Flash Light" a song originally penned with Bootsy Collins in mind for the lead vocal, however Collins turned it down).  "Bootzilla" failed to make the Hot 100.

The song's lyrics introduce Bootsy's wind-up toy alter ego Bootzilla, "the world's only rhinestone rock-star doll." The track features Bootsy Collins on drums as well as bass guitar.

References

Bootsy Collins songs
1978 singles
Songs written by Bootsy Collins
Songs written by George Clinton (funk musician)
1978 songs
Warner Records singles